Flosard Malçi (born 23 December 1994) is an Albanian professional footballer who plays as a right winger for Greek Super League 2 club Athens Kallithea.

External links
 
 

1994 births
Living people
Association football wingers
Albanian footballers
AEK Athens F.C. players
A.O. Nea Ionia F.C. players
A.O. Glyfada players
Ilisiakos F.C. players
Asteras Magoula F.C. players
KF Laçi players
KF Bylis Ballsh players
Albanian expatriate footballers
Expatriate footballers in Greece
Albanian expatriate sportspeople in Greece